The Local Government Official Information and Meetings Act 1987 (sometimes known by its acronym LGOIMA) is a statute of the New Zealand Parliament which creates a public right of access to information held by local authorities and council-controlled organisations and sets standards of openness for local authority meetings. It is one of New Zealand's freedom of information laws.

Summary of the Act 
The Act is an implementation of freedom of information legislation. It creates a regime by which any person can request and receive information held by local authorities and council-controlled organisations. The request regime mirrors that of the Official Information Act 1982 (OIA), with similar (though more limited) withholding grounds. A significant difference is that requests under LGOIMA can be made by "any person", rather than New Zealand citizens or residents. As with the OIA, decisions made under the Act can be appealed to the Ombudsman, and there is immunity from civil and criminal proceedings for good faith decisions to release information under the Act.

The Act also sets standards for local government transparency, requiring that meetings of local authorities be publicly notified and open to the public and that their agendas, reports, and minutes be available to the public. Local authorities can exclude the public from part of a meeting only after a resolution and for specified reasons. Additional provisions provide privilege against defamation for local authority minutes and agendas, and protect oral statements made at local authority meetings.

In 2012 the Act was reviewed by the New Zealand Law Commission as part of its review of the OIA. The Law Commission recommended that it be incorporated into a rewritten, general freedom of information law covering both central and local government.

In November 2022 the government introduced legislation to add "national security" withholding grounds to the Act.

See also 
 Local government in New Zealand
 Office of the Ombudsman
 Official Information Act 1982

References

External links 
 FYI – create and browse requests for official information and local body information
 Local Government Official Information and Meetings Act 1987 on legislation.govt.nz
 Office of the Ombudsman

Statutes of New Zealand
Freedom of information legislation
1987 in New Zealand law
History of local government in New Zealand